Synetic Theater is a non-profit physical theater company located in the Washington, D.C. metropolitan area. It performs at the Crystal City Theatre in Arlington Virginia. Since its formation its productions have received numerous awards.

History

Founded in 2001, Synetic Theater began as an artistic subgroup within the now defunct Stanislavsky Theater Studio which performed at the Church Street Theater in Washington, D.C. – the result of an artistic split by the husband and wife team of Paata and Irina Tsikurishvili from Andrei Malaev-Babel, the other co-head of The Stanislavsky Theater Studio.  It made its artistic debut in April 2002 with a wordless adaptation of Shakespeare's Hamlet, known as Hamlet…the rest is silence. The production was remounted the following season, receiving the Helen Hayes Award for Outstanding Resident Play, Outstanding Choreography and Outstanding Director. Despite the artistic split, Synetic Theater and The Stanislavsky Theater Studio continued to share resources and performance space into the following season, but in 2003, after a series of disagreements over financial matters, Synetic set off on its own. The following year Synetic merged with Classika Theater, a children's theater based in Shirlington, Virginia.

In 2014 Synetic Co-Founders Paata and Irina Tsikurishvili were honored as Washingtonians of the Year by Washingtonian Magazine for their contributions to the Washington theater community. In 2010, the American Theatre Wing awarded Synetic with their National Theatre Company Grant.

Facilities

The Synetic Theater's offices and administrative spaces are located 2155 Crystal Plaza Arcade, T-19, Arlington, VA 22202 in the Crystal City area of Arlington. Until 2010 Synetic performed most of its shows in the Arlington County run Rosslyn Spectrum. In September 2010 it moved into the Crystal City Theatre space outfitted by the Arena Stage after the latter moved back into its newly renovated spaces in Washington D.C. Between 2006–2010, it performed one show each spring in the Kennedy Center. In the 2009–2010 season it produced the premiers of its "Silent Shakespeare" series at the Shakespeare Theatre Company's Lansburgh Theatre. With the company's move to Crystal City, the relationship with the Shakespeare Theatre Company and the Lansburgh Theatre ended.

Past Productions

2015-2016
Alice in Wonderland,  Sep 30 - Nov 8, 2015.
As You Like It, Dec 9, 2015 – Jan 17, 2016.
Romeo and Juliet†, Feb 17 - Mar 27, 2016.
The Man in the Iron Mask, May 11 - Jun 19, 2016.
Twelfth Night†, July 13 - August 7, 2016.
† Remounted

2014-2015
The Island of Dr. Moreau,  Oct 1 - Nov 2, 2014.
Beauty and the Beast, Dec 3, 2014 – Jan 4, 2015.
Much Ado About Nothing, Feb 11 - Mar 15, 2015.
A Tale of Two Cities, May 13 - Jun 14, 2015.
A Midsummer Night's Dream†, July 15 - August 9, 2015.
† Remounted

2013-2014
The Picture of Dorian Gray,  Sept. 26, 2013 — Nov. 3, 2013
Twelfth Night, Jan. 9, 2014 — Feb 16, 2014
Hamlet ... the rest is silence†, March 13, 2014 — April 6, 2014
Three Men in a Boat (To Say Nothing of the Dog), May 8, 2014 — June 8, 2014

2012/2013 
Jekyll & Hyde, September 20 — October 21, 2012
A Trip to the Moon, December 6, 2012 — January 6, 2013
The Tempest, February 21 — March 24, 2013
The Three Musketeers, May 9 — June 9, 2013
A Midsummer Night's Dream†, July 24 - August 4, 2013
† Remounted

2011/2012:
Speak No More: Silent Shakespeare Festival
Macbeth†, September 14 – October 2, 2011 at Crystal City
Othello†, October 19 – November 6, 2011 at Crystal City
Romeo And Juliet†, November 25 – December 23, 2011 at Crystal City
New Movements – New Works, New Artists Festival
Genesis Reboot, February 9 – March 3, 2012 at Crystal City
"The Voice of Anne Frank", March 14 and March 19, 2012 at Crystal City
Taming Of The Shrew, March 31 – April 22, 2012 at the Lansburgh Theatre
Home Of The Soldier, May 23 – July 1, 2012 at Crystal City
† Remounted

2010/2011
 King Arthur, September 30 – October 31, 2010 at Crystal City
 The Master and Margarita†, November 11 – December 12, 2010 at the Lansburgh Theatre
 A Midsummer Night's Dream†, January 25–30, 2011 at Crystal City
 King Lear, March 24 – April 24, 2011 at the Lansburgh Theatre
 Don Quixote, June 2 – July 3, 2011 at Crystal City
† Remounted

2009–2010 Season
 A Midsummer Night's Dream†, September 17 – October 10, 2009 at Rosslyn Spectrum
 Dracula†, October 16 – November 15, 2009 at Rosslyn Spectrum
 Antony and Cleopatra, January 28 – February 28, 2010 at Lansburgh Theatre
 Metamorphosis, April 9 – May 22, 2010 at Rosslyn Spectrum
 Othello, June 3 – July 3, 2010 at The John F. Kennedy Center
† Remounted

2008–2009 Season
 Host and Guest†, September 26 – November 9, 2008 at Rosslyn Spectrum
 Dante, February 6 – March 22, 2009 at Rosslyn Spectrum
 Lysistrata, March 27 – April 5, 2009 at Georgetown University, April 11–26, 2009 at Rosslyn Spectrum
 A Midsummer Night's Dream, May 28 – June 15, 2009 at The John F. Kennedy Center
Since many of Synetic's company members were from Georgia, Host and Guest was remounted in reaction to the Russian invasion of Georgia in August 2008. The production replaced the originally scheduled stage adaptation of the vintage horror film The Cabinet of Dr. Caligari
† Remounted

Significant events
In 2010 Synetic Theater moved to the Crystal City Theatre in Arlington VA.

Synetic Theater was invited to perform in Tbilisi, Georgia. Remount performances of King Lear and Host and Guest were presented at the Rustaveli Theatre 3-19 Nov 2012. The tour was supported by the U.S. Department of State, the Mid-Atlantic Arts Foundation and the Trust for Mutual Understanding.

In 2013 Synetic raised funds for new studio space in Crystal City near the theater space. The studio has 3 classrooms that can be used for camps, classes and rehearsal space as well as a green room and a reception area.

In 2014 Synetic Theater produced its 10th "silent Shakespeare" adaptation "Twelfth Night."

In 2014, Synetic Theater's production of A Midsummer Night's Dream was invited to the 10th Festival Internacional in Chihuahua, Mexico. Subsequently, they also performed at Teatro Victor Hugo Rascon Banda, Juarez, Mexico.

Significant past productions

Silent Shakespeare series
Synetic is noted for performing well known Shakespeare plays without words. Hours long plays are pared to 90 minutes of highly stylized dance, movement, acrobatics, pantomime, music and story without a word being spoken. In a letter to patrons in a program, Michael Kahn, the Artistic Director of the Shakespeare Theatre Company, says: "Synetic's signature blend of music, movement, and dance represents a novel approach to Shakespeare" In the Directors Notes of The Tempest program Paata Tsisurishvili stated "Since our first production in 2002, I have often been asked, without the language, is what we do really Shakespeare? I believe it is. Since Shakespeare has been translated into multiple languages, his words having found multiple expressions and becoming a truly universal institution in the process, we believe the language of movement is no less valid method of exploring his work than any other. As Shakespeare himself painted with words, we attempt to paint his words with our images, offering an archetypical Shakespeare that we know, as one reviewer put it, 'in our bones'"

Productions are regularly remounted in the years following their initial production.

The series includes the following well reviewed and award-winning productions:

^ – Helen Hayes Award Winner

† – Named one of the year's "10 best" by the Washington Post

In January 2011 A Midsummer Night's Dream  was remounted by invitation at the '62 Center for Theatre and Dance at Williams College in Williamstown, MA,

Classic Literature series

The Washington Post named Host and Guest as one of the ten best performances of the decade. The Harriman Institute at Columbia University requested its presentation it at the university's Miller Theatre

Awards
Overall, Synetic has earned a large number of Helen Hayes Nominations and won many Helen Hayes Awards in ten seasons. Most of the awards have been for its wordless Shakespearean repertoire. Its more prestigious awards include:

 2012 Outstanding Sound Design/original music, Resident Production, Konstantine Lortkipanidze, King Lear .
 2012 Outstanding Choreography, Resident Production, Ben Cunis, Irina Tsikurishvili King Lear.
 2012 Outstanding Ensemble, Resident Play, King Lear.
 2011 Outstanding Director: Resident Play, Paata Tsikurishvili, Othello.
 2011 The Canadian Embassy Award for Outstanding Ensemble, Resident Play, Othell.
 2011 Outstanding Costume Designer: Resident Play, Anastasia Simes, Othello.
 2011 Outstanding Lighting Design: Resident Play, Colin Bills, Master & Margarita.
 2010 The Canadian Embassy Award for Outstanding Ensemble, Resident Play, A Midsummer Night's Dream.
 2009 The Canadian Embassy Award for Outstanding Ensemble, Resident Play, Romeo and Juliet.
 2009 Outstanding Director: Resident Play, Paata Tsikurishvili, Romeo and Juliet.
 2009 Outstanding Choreography: Resident Production, Irina Tsikurishvili, Carmen.
 2008 Outstanding Resident Play, Macbeth.
 2008 The Canadian Embassy Award for Outstanding Ensemble, Resident Play, Hamlet … the rest is silence.
 2008 Outstanding Director: Resident Play, Paata Tsikurishvili, Macbeth.
 2008 Outstanding Choreography: Resident Production, Irina Tsikurishvili, Macbeth.
 2008 Outstanding Sound Design: Resident Production, Paata Tsikurishvili, iriakli kavsadze Macbeth.
 2008 Outstanding Supporting Actor: Resident Production, Phillip Fletcher, Macbeth.
 2007 Outstanding Choreography: Resident Production, Irina Tsikurishvili, Frankenstein.
 2005 Outstanding Choreography: Resident Production, Irina Tsikurishvili, The Master and Margarita.
 2003 Outstanding Resident Play, Hamlet … the rest is silence.
 2003 Outstanding Director: Resident Play, Paata Tsikurishvili, Hamlet … the rest is silence.
 2003 Outstanding Choreography: Resident Production, Irina Tsikurishvili, Hamlet … the rest is silence.

Other items of note
The name Synetic was coined by founding artistic director Paata Tsikurishvili from the words Synthesis (the coming together of distinct elements to form a whole) and Kinetic (pertaining to or imparting motion; active ... dynamic ...) yielding "Synetic Theater – a Dynamic Synthesis of the Arts"

Synetic Theater is a member of the League of Washington Theaters (LOWT).

See also

Helen Hayes Award

References

External links
http://www.synetictheater.org
http://www.potomacstages.com/Synetic.htm
The Washington Post

Theatre companies in Washington, D.C.
Theatre companies in Virginia
Regional theatre in the United States
Theatres in Virginia
Members of the Cultural Alliance of Greater Washington
League of Washington Theatres
2001 establishments in Washington, D.C.
Theatres in Washington, D.C.
Arts organizations established in 2001